Charlie Soong Hui Lee (born December 30, 1971), known professionally as C.S. Lee, is an American actor and comedian. He is perhaps best known for playing forensics analyst Vince Masuka on the Showtime drama series Dexter.

Personal life
Lee was born in Cheongju, South Korea. Film became his passion in high school while playing football at Hudson's Bay High School in Vancouver, Washington. He attended Cornish College of the Arts on an acting scholarship and graduated with a Bachelor of Fine Arts degree. He graduated from the Yale School of Drama with a Master of Fine Arts degree. Lee started his career in New York City acting with various theater companies, regional theater, as well as performing in television and film.

He is married to Lara Cho.

Career
Lee was best known for the Showtime drama series Dexter, playing the role of Vince Masuka, a forensic scientist known for his raunchy sense of humor and love of women.  

Lee plays Dr. Ba on the HBO drama series The Sopranos. He plays a doctor in the 2009 film The Unborn. Lee has also appeared as Harry Tang, Chuck's officious co-worker, in the NBC comedy-spy series Chuck and as a deputy in an episode of Monk, "Mr. Monk Is on the Run (Part One)".  He can also be seen as the office worker holding the boombox in the award-winning Nextel commercial, "Nextel Dance Party". In the CBS series The Unit, Lee plays a small part as a South Korean submariner in episode 13 of the second season.

He also provides the voice of Jin Jae-Hoon and Illuminati Pyramidion in the video game The Secret World.

Filmography

Film

Television

Video games

References

External links

 

1971 births
Living people
American male actors of Korean descent
American male film actors
American male stage actors
American male television actors
American male voice actors
South Korean emigrants to the United States
People from Cheongju
People from Vancouver, Washington
Male actors from Washington (state)
Yale School of Drama alumni
Yale University alumni
Cornish College of the Arts alumni
20th-century American male actors
21st-century American male actors